Western Sting are an Australian netball team that represents Netball Western Australia in the Australian Netball League. They were ANL champions in 2017.  Western Sting are effectively the representative team of the West Australian Netball League and the reserve team of West Coast Fever.

History

Australian Netball League
In 2008, Netball Western Australia entered a team in the Australian Netball League. They were founder members of the league. In 2011 the team began playing as Western Sting. Between 2013 and 2014 future West Coast Fever head coach, Stacey Marinkovich (née Rosman) served as the Sting head coach. In 2017 with a squad that included Olivia Lewis, Sophie Garbin, Lindal Rohde, Annika Lee-Jones and Kaylia Stanton, Western Sting reached their first grand final and won their first ANL title.

Representative team
Western Sting are effectively the representative team of the West Australian Netball League.

ANL Grand finals

Home venues
During the 2019 Australian Netball League season Sting played their home games at the Perth State Netball Centre.

Notable players

2020 squad

  
 

Notes
  Sunday Aryang, Emma Cosh, Donnell Wallam and Courtney Kruta are West Coast Fever training partners.

Internationals

 Kate Beveridge
 Ashleigh Brazill
 Courtney Bruce
 Kaylia Stanton

 Erena Mikaere

West Coast Fever

ANL MVP

Head coaches

Premierships
Australian Netball League
Winners: 2017: 1

References

 
Netball teams in Western Australia
Netball teams in Australia
Sporting clubs in Perth, Western Australia
West Coast Fever
Australian Netball League teams
Netball
Sports clubs established in 2008
2008 establishments in Australia
Australian Netball Championship teams